Dubinsky, Dubinskiy, or Dubinski is a surname. Notable people with the surname include:

Angelika Dubinski (born 1995), German figure skater
Brandon Dubinsky (born 1986), American ice hockey player
David Dubinsky (1892-1982), American labor leader
Donna Dubinsky (born 1955), American businesswoman
Eduard Dubinski (1935-1969), Ukrainian football player
Leon Dubinsky, Canadian actor
Oleksandr Dubinsky(born 1981),  Ukrainian journalist, politician, blogger
Steve Dubinsky (born 1970), Canadian ice hockey player